The Statute of Sicily establishes the rule of Sicily as the Autonomous Region within the political unity of the Italian State and was issued by King Umberto II of Savoy, on 15 May 1946. Its enactment has thus preceded the birth of the Italian Constitution, which the statute would become an integral part on February 26, 1948.

The statute was drafted by a commission formed by politicians of the Committee of National Liberation accompanied by three teachers of the Law Faculty of the University of Palermo. The three lawyers make a crucial contribution and was in particular administrative cases expert Giovanni Salemi (one of the three lawyer) to treat the drafting of the entire text of the bill containing the Statute. The process which would create the Statute began May 13, 1945, a year before its enactment.

The principles constituting the text was intended to define the character of the Sicilian Region with great force. The new entity, in addition to being equipped with tangible assets like land and people, under the Statute also had intangible items such as power control. This power allowed the Sicilian Region for their own development and the right to adopt legal standards are major, assuming an identity that differentiates it from the State despite the commitment to maintain its political unity.

The statute stipulated that all state property and assets, except those involving the defense of the State or services of national character, go from the Italian state to the Sicilian Region and that it should provide for their financial needs with own taxes.

In the special statute was provided for the establishment of a High Court established in Rome appointed to ensure compliance with the limits of the different powers of the Region and State and the principles enshrined in the Constitution. The High Court, with one major ruling of July 19, 1948, enshrined the principle of the immutability of the statute with an ordinary law of the State. After ten years, its power to affirm a judicial review on laws has been stripped by Constitutional Court.

The statute also establishes the governing bodies of the Region: the Sicilian Regional Assembly, the Executive and President of the Region.

Principles of the Staff Regulations 
According to the principles of the Autonomous Statute, the Region has exclusive competence in certain matters; in essence, Sicily can legislate with its own acts in the areas indicated both in the Constitution and in the Statute. Any amendment to the Statute, since it is a constitutional law, is subject to the so-called "aggravated" procedure (iter legis aggravato), which requires majority approval in both Houses of the Italian Parliament (see ).

The Region was born as an entity originally sovereign and linked to Italy by a contractual and potentially equal relationship. This legal condition, which gives rise to the use of the adjective after the official name of the institution (Regione Siciliana), is due to mainly political reasons at that time why the Sicilian administrative entity is considered a primary source of law.

Exclusive competences 
According to the Special Statute, the Region has exclusive competence in a number of matters, including cultural, heritage, agriculture, fisheries, local authorities, environment, tourism, forestry police. The relative staff is therefore in the roles of the Region and not of the State, which is therefore more large than in the other regions with ordinary statutes.

As far as tax matters are concerned, all taxes collected in Sicily should remain on the island. In accordance with Articles 36 and following of its Statute (Constitutional Law No. 2 of February 26, 1948), the Sicilian Region is endowed with complete financial and fiscal autonomy.

Every year the Italian State would be required to provide an amount to be established, with a five-year plan, of public money coming from the other regions to finance Sicily, as established by art. 38 of the Statute of the Sicilian Region.

 The State will pay annually to the Region, as a national solidarity, a sum to be used, on the basis of an economic plan, in the execution of public works.
 This sum will tend to balance the lower amount of labor income in the region in comparison with the national average.
 A five-year review of this allocation will be carried out with reference to changes in the data taken for the previous calculation.

Another important aspect is contained in Article 37 of the Statute of the Sicilian Region:

 For industrial and commercial enterprises, which have their headquarters outside the territory of the Region, but which have factories and plants in it, the share of income to be attributed to the plants and plants themselves is determined in the assessment of income.
 The tax, relating to that share, is the responsibility of the Region and is collected by the collecting authorities of the same.

Although in theory all the taxes collected in Sicily should remain on the island, in practice, to this day, Articles 36, 37 and 38 remain largely unenforced (because, de facto, the island is an internal colony of Italy), entailing the loss of several billion euros in revenue for the coffers of the Sicilian island.

References 

Politics of Sicily
Politics of Italy
History of Sicily
1946 in Italy
 
1946 documents